Tom Barry (born Hal Donahue; July 31, 1885 – November 7, 1931) was a vaudeville sketch writer, playwright and screenwriter.  He was nominated for two Oscars for Best Screenplay,  for In Old Arizona and The Valiant at the 2nd Academy Awards.

Selected filmography
Under Suspicion (1930)
 In Old Arizona (1929) 
 The Valiant (1929)

References

External links
 

1885 births
1931 deaths
American male screenwriters
Writers from Kansas City, Missouri
Screenwriters from Missouri
20th-century American male writers
20th-century American screenwriters